The green damselfish (Abudefduf abdominalis), also known as the Hawaiian sergeant major, is a non-migratory fish of the family Pomacentridae. It occurs in the Pacific Ocean in the vicinity of the Hawaiian Islands, Midway Island and Johnston Atoll. It can grow to a maximum total length of 30 cm (11.8 inches). 

Adults of the species are typically found in quiet waters with rocky bottoms in inshore and offshore reefs at a depth of 1 to 50 m (3 to 164 ft), although juveniles may sometimes be found in surge pools. It is a benthopelagic species, with adults being known to form schools. The species feeds on a variety of algae and zooplankton and is oviparous, with distinct pairing occurring during breeding. Eggs of Abudefduf abdominalis are demersal and adhere to the substrate, with males guarding and aerating the eggs. The species is known to be used as a food source for humans in Hawaii. It occasionally appears in the aquarium trade.

References 

green damselfish
Endemic fauna of Hawaii
Fish of Hawaii
green damselfish
Taxa named by Jean René Constant Quoy
Taxa named by Joseph Paul Gaimard